The 1980 Vanderbilt Commodores football team represented Vanderbilt University in the 1980 NCAA Division I-A football season. The Commodores were led by head coach George MacIntyre in his second season and finished the season with a record of two wins and nine losses (2–9 overall, 0–6 in the SEC).

Schedule

Source: 1980 Vanderbilt football schedule

Personnel

References

Vanderbilt
Vanderbilt Commodores football seasons
Vanderbilt Commodores football